Trap Talk is the sixth mixtape released by American rapper Rich the Kid. It was released on April 19, 2016, by Quality Control Music, Rich Forever Music and 300 Entertainment. Trap Talk includes guest appearances from Ty Dolla $ign, Migos, 21 Savage, and others. It is available on music streaming platforms, such as SoundCloud. The song "Plug" was the only single that was released in November 2015, and made it on the mixtape.

Critical Receptions

Hotnewhiphop gave the mixtape a 4.5 star rating out of 5.

Track listing

References

2016 mixtape albums
Rich the Kid albums
Albums produced by Harry Fraud
Albums produced by PartyNextDoor
Albums produced by Zaytoven